Derevnya Geofizikov is a rural locality (a village) in Chesnokovsky Selsoviet, Ufimsky District, Bashkortostan, Russia. The population was 509 as of 2010. There are 5 streets.

Geography 
Derevnya Geofizikov is located 19 km south of Ufa (the district's administrative centre) by road. Torfyanoy is the nearest rural locality.

References 

Rural localities in Ufimsky District